Car is a surname. Notable people with the surname include:

Nicole Car (born 1985), Australian operatic soprano
Marko Car (disambiguation), multiple people
Mirosław Car (1960–2013), Polish footballer
Roberto Car (born 1947), Italian physicist
Stanisław Car (1882–1938), Polish politician
Viktor Car Emin (1870–1963), Croatian writer

See also

Carr (surname)
Cari (name)
Duje Ćaleta-Car (born 1996), Croatian professional footballer